Bulgaria participated in the Eurovision Song Contest 2009 with the song "Illusion" written by Krassimir Avramov, William Tabanou and Casie Tabanou. The song was performed by Avramov. The Bulgarian broadcaster Bulgarian National Television (BNT) organised the national final Bŭlgarskata pesen v „Evroviziya 2009” in order to select the Bulgarian entry for the 2009 contest in Moscow, Russia. 45 entries were selected to participate in the first phase of the national final, Be a Star, which consisted of three monthly selections. Nine entries qualified to compete in Bŭlgarskata pesen v „Evroviziya 2009” which consisted of two shows: a semi-final and a final, held on 24 January 2009 and 21 February 2009, respectively. Eighteen entries competed in the semi-final and the top nine songs as determined by an eight-member jury panel qualified to the final alongside three pre-qualified songs. In the final, public televoting exclusively selected "Illusion" performed by Avramov as the winning entry with 19,553 votes.

Bulgaria was drawn to compete in the first semi-final of the Eurovision Song Contest which took place on 12 May 2009. Performing during the show in position 11, "Illusion" was not announced among the 10 qualifying entries of the first semi-final and therefore did not qualify to compete in the final. It was later revealed that Bulgaria placed sixteenth out of the 18 participating countries in the semi-final with 7 points.

Background 

The nation achieved their best result in the contest in 2007 with the song "Water" performed by Elitsa Todorova and Stoyan Yankoulov, which placed fifth. To this point, their 2007 entry is also the only Bulgarian entry to have qualified to the Eurovision final; the nation had failed to qualify to the final with their other three entries. In 2008, Deep Zone and Balthazar and their song "DJ, Take Me Away" failed to qualify to the final.

The Bulgarian national broadcaster, Bulgarian National Television (BNT), broadcasts the event within Bulgaria and organises the selection process for the nation's entry. BNT confirmed Bulgaria's participation in the 2009 Eurovision Song Contest on 6 July 2008. Since 2005, the broadcaster has organised a national final in order to select the Bulgarian entry for the competition, a selection procedure that continued for their 2009 entry. The 2009 Bulgarian national final took place over two phases.

Before Eurovision

Be a Star
Be a Star was first phase of the national final format developed by BNT which determined the artist and song that would represent Bulgaria at the Eurovision Song Contest 2009. The competition consisted of three monthly selections between October and December 2008, held at the National Palace of Culture in Sofia. All shows were hosted by Neli Atanasova and Dragomir Draganov and broadcast on BNT 1 as well as online via the broadcaster's website bnt.bg.

Format 
The three monthly selections each featured three weekly heats with five competing entries each. Public televoting and the votes of a jury panel selected three entries from each heat to advance to the monthly final. The jury selected the first qualifier, while the remaining four entries faced a public televote which selected an additional two qualifiers to proceed in the competition. In the monthly final, the nine competing entries were voted upon by the public in order to select the top three that advanced to Bŭlgarskata pesen v „Evroviziya 2009”.

Competing entries 
On 6 July 2008, BNT opened a submission period for artists and songwriters to submit their entries until 19 September 2008. Songs were required to contain partial Bulgarian involvement. By the end of the deadline, the broadcaster received 45 eligible entries out of the 54 submitted. On 20 September 2008, the forty-five artists and songs for the competition were announced. Prior to the fourth heat, Sahara withdrew her song "Don't Kiss for Money" from the competition in order to be selected for the second phase of the national final.

Shows

October selection
The October selection took place between 2 and 23 October 2008. Three entries qualified to the monthly final from each heat. A jury panel first selected one song to advance and the remaining entries then faced a public televote which determined an additional two qualifiers. In the monthly final, the three entries that qualified to Bŭlgarskata pesen v „Evroviziya 2009” were selected exclusively by public televoting.

November selection
The November selection took place between 30 October and 13 November 2008. Three entries qualified to the monthly final from each heat. A jury panel first selected one songs to advance and the remaining entries then faced a public televote which determined an additional two qualifiers. In the monthly final, the three entries that qualified to Bŭlgarskata pesen v „Evroviziya 2009” were selected exclusively by public televoting.

December selection
The December selection took place between 27 November and 11 December 2008. Three entries qualified to the monthly final from each heat. A jury panel first selected one songs to advance and the remaining entries then faced a public televote which determined an additional two qualifiers. In the monthly final, the three entries that qualified to Bŭlgarskata pesen v „Evroviziya 2009” were selected exclusively by public televoting.

Bŭlgarskata pesen v „Evroviziya 2009” 
Bŭlgarskata pesen v „Evroviziya 2009” (The Bulgarian song in Eurovision 2009) was the national final format developed by BNT which determined the artist and song that would represent Bulgaria at the Eurovision Song Contest 2009. The competition consisted of a semi-final on 24 January 2009 and a final on 21 February 2009, held at the National Palace of Culture in Sofia. Both shows were hosted by Neli Atanasova and Dragomir Simeonov and broadcast on BNT 1 as well as online via the broadcaster's website bnt.bg.

Competing entries 
On 1 October 2008, BNT opened a submission period for artists and songwriters to submit their entries until 19 December 2008. Songs were required to contain partial Bulgarian involvement. By the end of the deadline, the broadcaster received 38 entries. On 20 December 2008, the eighteen artists and songs selected for the semi-final of the competition were announced. Nine of the entries were the qualifiers of Be a Star, while the remaining nine entries were selected by a twelve-member committee from the remaining non-qualifying acts of Be a Star (Ivelina and Moto) and from the newly submitted songs. Among the artists, JuraTone previously represented Bulgaria at the Eurovision Song Contest 2008 as part of the group Deep Zone. An additional three entries came from artists internally selected by BNT and automatically qualified for the final of the competition: Grafa, Mariana Popova and Poli Genova. Mariana Popova previously represented Bulgaria at the Eurovision Song Contest 2006. On 10 January 2009, "Ring the Bells" performed by Vessy was withdrawn due to copyright issues and replaced with the song "Don't Break My Heart" performed by Erilien and Najam Sheraz.

Shows

Semi-final
The semi-final took place on 24 January 2009. Nine entries qualified to the final based on the votes of a jury panel. The eight-person jury consisted of Vasil Naydenov, Kiril Marichkov, Toncho Rusev, Yavor Kirin, Elitsa Todorova, Stoyan Yankoulov, Orlin Pavlov and Kalin Velov. In addition to the performances of the competing entries, guest performers were the three pre-qualified artists: Grafa, Mariana Popova and Poli Genova.

Final 
The final took place on 21 February 2009. The nine semi-final qualifiers along alongside the three automatic qualifiers competed and "Illusion" performed by Krassimir Avramov was selected as the winner exclusively by public televoting. In addition to the performances of the competing entries, the guest performer was Russian Eurovision Song Contest 1995 entrant Philipp Kirkorov.

Controversy 
Following the Bulgarian national final, several Bulgarian musicians openly issued letters demanding Avramov to withdraw from the Eurovision Song Contest whilst questioning the legitimacy of the voting and criticising his performing abilities. A protest took place in front of the BNT Headquarters on 24 February where a petition signed by over 3,000 people was submitted, while a live debate regarding the participation of Avramov took place during a special broadcast of Be a Star on 26 February. During the debate, the singer defended his Eurovision participation and stated that "Illusion" would be reworked for the contest.

Promotion 
Krassimir Avramov made several appearances across Europe to specifically promote "Illusion" as the Bulgarian Eurovision entry. Between 5 and 6 April, Avramov took part in promotional activities in Macedonia where he appeared during the MTV 1 show Iselenicki jbox and 100% Eurosong. Avramov also took part in promotional activities in Greece between 10 and 12 April which included an appearance during the Mega Channel morning programme Omorfos kosmos to proi. On 14 April, Avramov performed during the Antena 1 morning show Neatza cu Răzvan și Dani in Romania. On 17 April, Avramov performed during the UKeurovision Preview Party, which was held at the La Scala venue in London, United Kingdom and hosted by Nicki French and Paddy O'Connell. On 18 April, Avramov performed during the Eurovision Promo Concert event which was held at the Amsterdam Marcanti venue in Amsterdam, Netherlands and hosted by Marga Bult and Maggie MacNeal. On 23 April, Avramov concluded promotional activities in Turkey where he made radio and television appearances.

In addition to his international appearances, on 27 March, Avramov performed "Illusion" during the annual Lions Day with the United Nations event which was held at the National Archaeological Museum in Sofia. On 28 April, Avramov performed as the closing act of the music competition series Music Idol.

At Eurovision
The Eurovision Song Contest 2009 took place at the Olympic Stadium in Moscow, Russia and consisted of two semi-finals held on 12 and 14 May, respectively, and the final on 16 May 2009. According to Eurovision rules, all nations with the exceptions of the host country and the "Big Four" (France, Germany, Spain and the United Kingdom) are required to qualify from one of two semi-finals in order to compete for the final; the top nine songs from each semi-final as determined by televoting progress to the final, and a tenth was determined by back-up juries. The European Broadcasting Union (EBU) split up the competing countries into six different pots based on voting patterns from previous contests, with countries with favourable voting histories put into the same pot. On 30 January 2009, a special allocation draw was held which placed each country into one of the two semi-finals. Finland was placed into the first semi-final, to be held on 12 May 2009. The running order for the semi-finals was decided through another draw on 16 March 2009 and as one of the seven wildcard countries, Bulgaria chose to perform in position 11, following the entry from Israel and before the entry from Iceland.

The two semi-finals and the final were broadcast in Bulgaria on BNT 1 with commentary by Elena Rosberg and Georgi Kushvaliev. The Bulgarian spokesperson, who announced the Bulgarian votes during the final, was Joanna Dragneva who represented Bulgaria at the 2008 contest as the lead singer of Deep Zone.

Semi-final 
Krassimir Avramov took part in technical rehearsals on 4 and 8 May, followed by dress rehearsals on 11 and 12 May. The Bulgarian performance featured Avramov performing in a medieval costume, joined on stage by three backing vocalists at the front of the stage and two dancers on stilts at the back performing an acrobatic routine. The LED screens displayed fire and wheels of metal and the performance also featured the use of a wind machine. The three backing vocalists that joined Krassimir Avramov were Albena Veskova, Anna Lozanova and Petya Buyuklieva, while the dancers were Carin Noland and Trey Knight.

At the end of the show, Bulgaria was not announced among the top 10 entries in the first semi-final and therefore failed to qualify to compete in the final. It was later revealed that Bulgaria placed sixteenth in the semi-final, receiving a total of 7 points.

Voting 
Below is a breakdown of points awarded to Bulgaria and awarded by Bulgaria in the first semi-final and grand final of the contest. The nation awarded its 12 points to Turkey in the semi-final and to Greece in the final of the contest.

Points awarded to Bulgaria

Points awarded by Bulgaria

Detailed voting results

References

External links 
 BNT

2009
Countries in the Eurovision Song Contest 2009
Eurovision